Isogona scindens is a species of moth of the family Erebidae first described by Francis Walker in 1858. It is found from the southern parts of the United States to Paraguay and on Saint Kitts, Antigua, Grenada, Jamaica, Cuba, Hispaniola and Saint Croix.

External links

Boletobiinae